Turčianske Kľačany is a village and municipality in Martin District in the Žilina Region of northern Slovakia.

Etymology
Slovak Kľačane, see Kľačany for the details.

History
In historical records the village was first mentioned in 1403.

Geography
The municipality lies at an altitude of 410 metres and covers an area of 12.206 km². It has a population of about 840 people.

References

External links
 http://www.statistics.sk/mosmis/eng/run.html

Villages and municipalities in Martin District